Lyudmila Nikolayevna Trut (Russian: Людми́ла Никола́евна Трут, born 6 November 1933) is a Russian geneticist, ethologist, and evolutionist. She is known for developing domesticated silver foxes from wild foxes with Dmitry Belyayev at the Institute of Cytology and Genetics in Novosibirsk, Russia. The experiment, started in 1952, continues to this day covering nearly 60 generations of silver foxes selected for "tameness." She has held the positions of Senior researcher for Evolutionary genetics, Institute of Cytology and Genetics SB AS USSR, from 1969 to 1985; Head of Laboratory for Evolutionary Genetics, Institute of Cytology and Genetics, USSR, 1985 to 1990; Main Scientific Employee in the Laboratory for Evolutionary Genetics, Institute of Cytology and Genetics SB AS USSR, 1990 until the present; and Professor in Genetics, 2003 to the present at the Institute of Cytology and Genetics. Today she coordinates educational activities at the experimental fox farm at the Institute of Cytology and Genetics of the Russian Academy of Sciences in Novosibirsk, Russia. Trut was elected to the American Academy of Arts and Sciences in 2020.

Education
Trut grew up in the town of Kirzhach in the Soviet Union, now Russia. She graduated with Honors at Moscow State University in 1958, majoring in biology. In 1966, she earned a Candidate of Sciences degree from the Institute of Cytology and Genetics in Novosibirsk. Her thesis was titled: "On correlation of behavior characteristics with reproductive function in fur bearing animals of the Canidae family."  In 1981, she was awarded a Doctor of Sciences degree from the same institution, writing her thesis on the behavior of domesticated silver foxes.

Research

The silver fox is a melanistic form of the red fox. Domesticated silver foxes are the result of an experiment which was designed to demonstrate the power of selective breeding to transform species, as described by Charles Darwin in On the Origin of Species. The experiment explored whether selection for tame behavior produced dogs from wolves. Only the tamest members of each generation were allowed to breed, and the changes in the population were recorded. Many of the descendant foxes became both tamer and more dog-like in morphology, including displaying mottled or spotted fur.

Today, the experiment is under the supervision of Trut.

References

1933 births
Living people
Russian geneticists
Women geneticists
Russian ethnologists
Scientists from Novosibirsk